Hippolite Rarison Ramaroson (born 28 September 1951) is a Malagasy vice admiral and politician. During the 2009 Malagasy political crisis, after President Marc Ravalomanana stepped down, he became acting President of Madagascar for several hours on 17 March 2009, before transferring power to Andry Rajoelina. He went on to serve as Minister of Foreign Affairs and one of three Vice Prime Ministers in the High Transitional Authority from 2010 to 2011.

Early life 
Ramaroson was born on 28 September 1951 in Tananarive (Antananarivo), then the capital of French Madagascar.

Career 
Ramaroson joined the Military of Madagascar, enlisting in the Aeronaval Force, which includes both Madagascar's navy and air force. He rose to the rank of vice admiral.

President of Madagascar 
On 17 March 2009, after months of intense protests, President Marc Ravalomanana resigned. He left a signed note in which he assigned power to Ramaroson as president of the new "military directorate." As a result, Ramaroson was President of Madagascar for a few hours on that day. The military leadership called Ravalomanana's action a "ploy" and supported opposition leader Andry Rajoelina. In a ceremony broadcast from a military camp in Antananarivo, Ramaroson and two generals announced that they were ending the military directorate and installing Rajoeline in power. He said in the video, "We have categorically rejected the [military] authority that Ravalomanana asked us to set up after his resignation."

Later career 
On 24 February 2010, Ramaroson was appointed Vice Prime Minister and Minister of Foreign Affairs by President Rajoelina. He took possession of his offices the next morning, 25 February. He succeeded Ny Hasina Andriamanjato, who resigned earlier that month because he was "convince there would be no international recognition of Rajoelina unless he formed a unity government before elections. He became foreign minister at a time when foreign nations were concerned with the new administration's legitimacy and commitment to democracy, and the African Union's threat of sanctions should a power-sharing agreement not be in force by mid-March. Ramaroson told Reuters on the day of his appointment, "My principal mission is to explain to the international community what really happened in Madagascar. I will also talk to our ambassadors so they work for the country."

The Madagascar Tribune noted that Ramaroson caused some embarrassment for the president when he announced his appointment as deputy prime minister and foreign minister to the press before the High Transitional Authority had even done so. In addition, the Tribune speculated that Ramaroson's status as a vice admiral in the armed forces could be a source of embarrassment, given that he, as Deputy Prime Minister, outranked Prime Minister Albert Camille Vital, a colonel.

At the United Nations General Assembly in 2010, Madagascar was the only country not to make an address. The reason cited were the events of the 2009 General Assembly, in which a majority of African countries voted to prevent President Rajoelina from speaking. Ramaroson explained to Reuters, "We didn't want a repeat of that... It's not worth squabbling in this General Assembly. That's why we decided not to speak... No one told us to pull out."

Ramaroson stepped down as Vice Prime Minister and Foreign Minister in March 2011.

Personal life 
Ramaroson is married to Joelle Jacky Rajao. They have three children, Hary, Tantely, and Geraldine.

See also 
 List of presidents of Madagascar

References 

1951 births
20th-century Malagasy people
20th-century military personnel
21st-century military personnel
21st-century Malagasy politicians
Admirals
Deputy prime ministers
Foreign Ministers of Madagascar
Government ministers of Madagascar
Living people
Malagasy military personnel
Malagasy politicians
Military dictatorships
People from Antananarivo
Presidents of Madagascar